Morimoto (written:  lit. "(one who lives) near the forest") is a Japanese surname. Notable people with the surname include:

, Japanese cyclist
Carlos Morimoto, Brazilian software engineer and author
, Japanese footballer
Kana Morimoto (born 1992), Japanese kickboxer 
Koji Morimoto, Japanese animator and anime director
Kozueko Morimoto, manga author
, Japanese middle-distance runner
Masaharu Morimoto, Japanese chef
Pedro Ken Morimoto, Brazilian footballer
Ryōji Morimoto, Japanese actor
Shigeki Morimoto, Japanese video game designer
Takayuki Morimoto, Japanese footballer
Tomo Morimoto, Japanese long-distance runner

Japanese-language surnames